Fell is a music genre performed by Goan Catholic men and women during the Goa Carnival before the Lent in Goa, India.

See also

References
The Garland encyclopedia of world music, p.39

 
Goan music